Ye-rin is a Korean feminine given name. Its meaning depends on the hanja used to write each syllable of the name.

Hanja and meaning
There are 34 hanja with the reading "ye" and 17 hanja with the reading "rin" on the South Korean government's official list of hanja which may be registered for use in given names. Ways of writing this name in hanja include:

 (밝을 예 balgeun ye "bright"; 물맑을 린 mulmalgeun rin "clear water")

People
People with this name include
Mun Ye-rin (born 1990), South Korean pentathlete, silver medalist in modern pentathlon at the 2010 Asian Games
Jung Ye-rin (born 1996), South Korean singer, member of girl group GFriend
Baek Ye-rin (born 1997), South Korean singer
Bang Ye-rin (born 1996), South Korean actress (Seol In-ah)
Yerin (entertainer), South Korean singer and actress

Fictional characters
Fictional characters with this name include:
Ye-rin, in South Korean online manhwa Ability
Seo Ye-rin, in 2012 South Korean film Almost Che
Lee Ye-rin, in 2013 South Korean television series Sincerity Moves Heaven

See also
List of Korean given names

References

Korean feminine given names